The Noether family is a family of German mathematicians, whose family name has been given to some of their mathematical contributions:
    
Max Noether (1844–1921), father of Emmy and Fritz Noether, 
Emmy Noether (1882–1935), professor at the University of Göttingen and at Bryn Mawr College
Fritz Noether (1884–1941), professor at the University of Tomsk
Gottfried E. Noether (1915–1991), son of Fritz Noether

See also
 Noether's theorem (disambiguation)
 List of things named after Emmy Noether

Scientific families
German families